Don Sylvestri (born June 2, 1961) is a Canadian retired professional ice hockey player who played three games in the National Hockey League with the Boston Bruins during the 1984–85 season.

Career statistics

Regular season and playoffs

Awards and honors

References

External links

1961 births
Living people
AHCA Division I men's ice hockey All-Americans
Boston Bruins draft picks
Boston Bruins players
Canadian ice hockey goaltenders
Clarkson Golden Knights men's ice hockey players
Ice hockey people from Ontario
Indianapolis Ice players
Oshawa Generals players
Pineridge Bucks players
Sportspeople from Greater Sudbury